The East Buchanan Community School District is rural public school district headquartered in Winthrop, Iowa.

The district is completely within Buchanan County, and serves Winthrop, Quasqueton, Aurora, and the surrounding rural areas.

Schools
The district operates three schools, in one facility in Winthrop:
 East Buchanan Elementary School
 East Buchanan Middle School
 East Buchanan High School

East Buchanan High School

Athletics
The Buccaneers participate in the Tri-Rivers Conference in the following sports:
Football (EBHS alum, Robert Gallery is a former NFL player and first round draft pick of the Oakland Raiders.
Cross Country
Volleyball
Basketball
Wrestling
Golf
Track and Field
 Boys' 2000 Class 1A State Champions
Baseball
Softball
Soccer (as part of teams from Independence)
Tennis (as part of teams from Independence)

See also
List of school districts in Iowa
List of high schools in Iowa

References

External links
 Central City Community School District

School districts in Iowa
Education in Buchanan County, Iowa